The Pennsylvanian (also known as Upper Carboniferous or Late Carboniferous) is, in the ICS geologic timescale, the younger of two subperiods (or upper of two subsystems) of the Carboniferous Period. As with most other geochronologic units, the rock beds that define the Pennsylvanian are well identified, but the exact date of the start and end are uncertain by a few hundred thousand years. The Pennsylvanian is named after the U.S. state of Pennsylvania, where the coal-productive beds of this age are widespread.

The division between Pennsylvanian and Mississippian comes from North American stratigraphy. In North America, where the early Carboniferous beds are primarily marine limestones, the Pennsylvanian was in the past treated as a full-fledged geologic period between the Mississippian and the Permian. In parts of Europe, the Mississippian and Pennsylvanian are one more-or-less continuous sequence of lowland continental deposits and are grouped together as the Carboniferous Period. The current internationally used geologic timescale of the ICS gives the Mississippian and Pennsylvanian the rank of subperiods, subdivisions of the Carboniferous Period.

Life

Fungi
All modern classes of fungi have been found in rocks of Pennsylvanian age.

Invertebrates 
The major forms of life at this time were the arthropods. Due to the high levels of oxygen, arthropods were far larger than modern ones. Arthropleura, a giant millipede relative, was a common sight and the giant dragonfly Meganeura "flew the skies".

Vertebrates
Amphibians were diverse and common; some were several meters long as adults. The collapse of the rainforest ecology in the mid-Pennsylvanian (between the Moscovian and the Kasimovian) removed many amphibian species that did not survive as well in the cooler, drier conditions. Amniotes, however, prospered due to specific key adaptations. One of the greatest evolutionary innovations of the Carboniferous was the amniote egg, which allowed for the further exploitation of the land by certain tetrapods. These included the earliest sauropsid reptiles (Hylonomus), and the earliest known synapsid pelycosaurs (Archaeothyris).  Small lizard-like animals quickly gave rise to many descendants. Amniotes underwent a major evolutionary radiation, in response to the drier climate that followed the rainforest collapse. 

For some reason, pelycosaurs were able to reach larger sizes before reptiles could, and this trend continued until the  end of the Permian, during which their cynodont descendants became smaller and nocturnal, as the reptilian archosaurs took over. Most pre-rainforest collapse tetrapods remained smaller, probably due to the land being primarily occupied by the gigantic millipedes, scorpions, and flying insects. After the rainforest collapse, the giant arthropods disappeared, allowing amniote tetrapods to achieve larger sizes.

Subdivisions
The Pennsylvanian has been variously subdivided. The international timescale of the ICS follows the Russian subdivision into four stages:

Bashkirian (oldest)
Moscovian
Kasimovian
Gzhelian (youngest)

North American subdivision is into five stages, but not precisely the same, with additional (older) Appalachian series names following:

Morrowan stage, corresponding with the middle and lower part of the Pottsville Group (oldest)
Atokan stage, corresponding with the upper part of the Pottsville group
Desmoinesian stage, corresponding with the Allegheny Group
Missourian stage, corresponding with the Conemaugh Group
Virgilian stage, corresponding with the Monongahela Group (youngest)

The Virgilian or Conemaugh corresponds to the Gzhelian plus the uppermost Kasimovian.
The Missourian or Monongahela corresponds to the rest of the Kasimovian.
The Desmoinesian or Allegheny corresponds to the upper half of the Moscovian.
The Atokan or upper Pottsville corresponds to the lower half of the Moscovian.
The Morrowan corresponds to the Bashkirian.

In the European subdivision, the Carboniferous is divided into two epochs: Dinantian (early) and Silesian (late). The Silesian starts earlier than the Pennsylvanian and is divided in three ages:
Namurian (corresponding to Serpukhovian and early Bashkirian)
Westphalian (corresponding to late Bashkirian, Moskovian and Kasimovian)
Stephanian (corresponding to Gzelian).

References

External links 
 The Late Carboniferous a Time of Great Coal Swamps, Paleomap project. World map from this time period.
 The Carboniferous – 354 to 290 Million Years Ago, University of California Museum of Paleontology. Information on stratigraphies, localities, tectonics, and life.
 The Pennsylvanian Epoch of the Carboniferous Period: 318 to 299 Mya, Paleos.com
 US Geological Survey comparison of time scales

 
 
02
Geological epochs